Bodywork or body work may refer to:
 "Body Work", a song from the album In the Air and performed by Morgan Page featuring Tegan and Sara
 Body Work, a comic series set in the Rivers of London universe
 Bodywork (alternative medicine), healing or personal development techniques that involve touching, energy medicine, or physical manipulation
 Car body style, the structure of a vehicle
 Coachbuilder, the body of a motor vehicle